Ayan Mukerji (born 15 August 1983) is an Indian filmmaker, screenwriter and producer who works in Hindi films. Mukerji made his directorial debut at the age of 26 with the coming-of-age comedy Wake Up Sid (2009). The film opened to strong reviews and box-office returns. His next directorial, the 2013 romantic comedy-drama, Yeh Jawaani Hai Deewani, ranks among the highest-grossing Hindi films. He then directed the fantasy action-adventure Brahmāstra: Part One – Shiva, which is the first in a planned trilogy of a cinematic universe named Astraverse. 

Mukerji is from a prominent Mukherjee-Samarth family of Indian cinema.

Early life and background
Mukerjee was born in a Bengali Hindu family in Kolkata, India, the son of Bengali film actor Deb Mukherjee. His family was steeped in the Indian film industry since the 1930, when his grandfather, Sashadhar Mukherjee, first ventured by chance into the field. Sashadhar Mukherjee was a pioneering film producer who was one of the founding partners of Filmistan Studio in Mumbai, and produced films like Dil Deke Dekho (1959), Love in Simla (1960), Ek Musafir Ek Hasina (1962) and Leader (1964). The studio is still run by Ayan's extended family.

Ayan's grandmother, Satidevi Mukherjee (née Ganguly), wife of Sashadhar Mukherji, was the sister of pioneer actor Ashok Kumar, Anup Kumar and singer Kishore Kumar. Ayan's grandfather's brothers were film producer Prabodh Mukherjee, director Subodh Mukherjee and Ravindra Mohan Mukherjee, grandfather of actress Rani Mukherjee. Ayan's father's brothers were actors Joy Mukherjee, Subir Mukherjee and Shomu Mukherjee, who is the husband of actress Tanuja and he made 3 movies and father of actresses Kajol and Tanisha Mukherjee.

Mukerji studied at Jamnabai Narsee School in Vile Parle, Mumbai. He later attended Rajiv Gandhi Institute of Technology but dropped out after the first year to assist Ashutosh Gowariker as clapper boy on Swades (2004).

Career
Mukerji started his career as an assistant to Ashutosh Gowariker, his brother-in-law, on Swades, and later to Karan Johar on Kabhi Alvida Naa Kehna (2006). After taking a short break from filmmaking, Mukerji wrote the screenplay for Wake Up Sid and directed it. The film released in 2009, starring Ranbir Kapoor and Konkona Sen Sharma in the lead roles and went on to become a critical and commercial success. The film earned him a Best Debut Director at Filmfare.

Mukerji's second film, also under Johar's banner Dharma Productions, was Yeh Jawaani Hai Deewani, with Ranbir Kapoor and Deepika Padukone in lead roles. It was a huge commercial success. The movie grossed Rs. 1 billion at the box-office in just 7 days. It became the third highest-grossing Indian film of all time. The film earned him a second Best Director nomination at Filmfare.

Mukerji's third film, Brahmāstra: Part One – Shiva, starring Ranbir Kapoor, Alia Bhatt, Mouni Roy, Nagarjuna Akkineni and Amitabh Bachchan released on 9th September 2022 under Johar's banner Dharma Productions. It is the first installment of this trilogy. The cinematic universe known as the Astraverse. The film emerged as a commercial success, with an estimated gross of over  worldwide, making it ultimately the highest-grossing Hindi film of 2022, one of the highest grossing Indian film of 2022 and the 20th highest-grossing Indian film of all time. Box Office India in their year-end report gave Brahmāstra: Part One – Shiva a ‘‘hit’’ verdict. 

As of September 2022, Mukerji is all set to direct the next in the second installment of this trilogy titled Brahmа̄stra: Part Two – Dev and the third installment of this trilogy titled Brahmāstra: Part Three – Brahmānsh.

Filmography

Awards

References

External links

 Brahmastra at Bollywood Hungama
"Somewhere in Wake up Sid, are bits and pieces of my life" – Ayan Mukerji

Film directors from Kolkata
Hindi-language film directors
Bengali film directors
Living people
1983 births
Filmfare Awards winners
Zee Cine Awards winners
21st-century Indian film directors